Scots Parliament can refer to:
 Parliament of Scotland, the pre-1707 legislature of the Kingdom of Scotland
 Scottish Parliament, the post-1999 unicameral devolved legislature of Scotland

See also
Scots (disambiguation)